Christoffel Jegher (1596, Antwerp – 1652, Antwerp), was a Flemish Baroque engraver.

Biography
According to the RKD he was the father of the engraver Jan Christoffel. He became a master in the Antwerp Guild of St. Luke in 1628. He collaborated with Rubens on woodcuts (he named his youngest son Pieter Paul after him). His son later assisted him with his prints.

References

Christoffel Jegher on Artnet

1596 births
1652 deaths
17th-century engravers
Flemish engravers
Painters from Antwerp
Woodcut cutters